The 2022 New Hampshire Wildcats football team represented the University of New Hampshire as a member of the Colonial Athletic Association (CAA) in the 2022 NCAA Division I FCS football season. The Wildcats, led by first-year head coach Ricky Santos, played their home games at Wildcat Stadium.

Previous season

The Wildcats finished the 2021 season 3–8, 2–6 in CAA play to finish in eleventh place. On December 1, 2021, head coach Sean McDonnell announce his retirement. He finish with a 22-year record of 157–104. Former New Hampshire quarterback Ricky Santos will be the next head coach.

Schedule

Game summaries

Monmouth

at Albany

North Carolina Central

at Towson

at Western Michigan

Stony Brook

at Dartmouth

No. 21 Elon

at No. 14 Richmond

No. 22 Rhode Island

at Maine

NCAA Division I First Round—No. 16 Fordham

NCAA Division I Second Round—at No. 7 Holy Cross

References

New Hampshire
New Hampshire Wildcats football seasons
Colonial Athletic Association football champion seasons
New Hampshire
New Hampshire Wildcats football